The Boatman of Amalfi (Italian: Il barcaiolo di Amalfi) is a 1954 Italian melodrama film directed by Mino Roli and starring Mario Vitale, Franca Marzi and Guido Celano. The film's sets were designed by the art director Massimiliano Capriccioli. It is based on the 1883 novel of the same title by Francesco Mastriani.

Cast
 Mario Vitale as Aspreno Selva 
 Franca Marzi as Cristina 
 Guido Celano as Antonio Selva 
 Leda Gloria as Rita Selva 
 Fiorella Ferrero as Mery 
 Margherita Bagni as Serafina 
 Luigi Cimara as Sir White - the consul 
 Oscar Blando as Toto' 
 Valeria Moriconi as Martina 
 Alessandra Panaro
 Roberto Bruni as Don Costanzo 
 Augusto Di Giovanni as Avv. difensore 
 Nino Marchesini
 Filippo Scelzo as Padre Felice 
 Aldo Sprovieri as Il commissario

References

Bibliography 
 Lancia, Enrico. Dizionario del cinema italiano : testi e strumenti per la scuola e l'università. Gli artisti : Vol. 3, Gli attori dal 1930 ai giorni nostri. Gremese Editore, 2003.

External links 
 

1954 drama films
Italian drama films
1954 films
1950s Italian-language films
Italian black-and-white films
Melodrama films
1950s Italian films